Golden Harvest was a New Zealand band, which formed in Morrinsville and moved to Auckland in the mid 1970s. They are best known for their lone top-ten hit, "I Need Your Love", from 1977, which was Single of the Year at the 1978 NZ Music Awards. The band was led by singer Karl Gordon. The four Kaukau brothers, Gavin, Mervyn, Eru and Kevin were the other members. By 1980 the group had split up, with Gordon embarking on a solo career and Mervyn and Kevin moving to Australia.

Discography

References

New Zealand rock music groups